Nicolas Sidjakov (December 16, 1924 – June 20, 1993) was a Latvian-born Russian American commercial artist and illustrator. He was a co-founder of Sidjakov & Berman Associates and later Sidjakov, Berman & Gomez design firms.

Biography 
Sidjakov was born in Riga, Latvia. He studied at the Ecole des Beaux Arts in Paris, worked in advertising, and freelanced for the French movie industry.  In 1954 he moved to the United States and continued to work in advertising. He also began to illustrate children's books, mainly picture books, beginning with The Friendly Beasts by Laura Nelson Baker, adapted from "The Friendly Beasts", an English Christmas carol. It was published in 1957 by Parnassus Press of Berkeley, California. 

Parnassus was a small press established only that year by Herman Schein, whose wife Ruth Robbins was a writer and illustrator. During the next several years it published at least three picture books created by Robbins, as writer, and Sidjakov. The first was Baboushka and the Three Kings, retelling the "Russian folktale about an old woman's endless search for the Christ child". For that work he received the annual Caldecott Medal from the American Library Association in 1961, as illustrator of the previous year's "most distinguished American picture book for children".

From 1945 to the 1970s, San Francisco was a hub of creativity and Sidjakov was in the thick of it. He designed more than he illustrated and there were many accolades for him in the advertising annuals of the 1960s and 1970s.

In 1978, he and Jerry Berman formed the design firm of Sidjakov & Berman Associates, then Sidjakov, Berman & Gomez in 1981. In 1987 the company became part of the British-owned WPP Group plc and is now known as Enterprise IG, San Francisco.

Sidjakov was a resident of Sausalito in Marin County, California, when he died in 1993.

Selected works

Picture books illustrated 
 The Friendly Beasts, written by Laura Nelson Baker (Berkeley, CA: Parnassus Press, 1959) – adapted from "The Friendly Beasts", 
 Baboushka and the Three Kings, Ruth Robbins (Parnassus, 1960) – adapted from Russian folklore, 
 The Emperor and the Drummer Boy, Ruth Robbins (Parnassus, 1962) – published simultaneously in French, the Emperor is Napoleon, 
 Harlequin and Mother Goose, or, The Magic Stick, Ruth Robbins (Parnassus, 1965) – based on English Harlequinade, 
 A Lodestone and a Toadstone, Irene Elmer (Alfred A. Knopf, 1969), 
 Staffan: an old Christmas folk song, translated from Swedish (Parnassus, 1970),

See also

References

External links
 Nicolas Sidjakov Papers at CLRC, University of Minnesota – with biographical sketch
 Linweave Tarot 1967, The illustrations of Hy Roth, Ron Rae, David Mario Palladini and Nicolas Sidjakov (part one) 
 

American children's book illustrators
American graphic designers
Caldecott Medal winners
Soviet expatriates in France
Artists from Riga
1924 births
1993 deaths
Soviet emigrants to the United States
Artists from San Francisco